Elsa Somville (born 29 May 2006) is a French rhythmic gymnast. She represent her country in international competitions.

Personal life 
Somville trains 30 hours per week at the pole in Calais, her dream is to compete at the Olympic Games. Outside the gym her hobbies are going out with friends and shopping. She speaks French, English and German.

Career 
In 2020 Elsa was included in the French national team, debuting at the international tournament in Corbeil-Essonnes. The same year she was then selected to compete at the European Championships in Kyiv along Lily Ramonatxo ending  4th in teams, 17th with rope, 15th with ball, 21st with clubs and 7th in the ribbon final.

In 2021 she won silver at the French Rhythmic Gymnastics Championships behind Margot Tran in the junior section, she also won bronze with ball behind Hélène Karbanov and Maelle Millet. The following year she took 6th place at her first senior nationals as well as 6th in the hoop final.

Routine music information

References 

French rhythmic gymnasts
2006 births
Living people
21st-century French women

People from Calais
Sportspeople from Calais